Montbronn (Lorraine Franconian: Mumere) is a commune in the Moselle department of the Grand Est administrative region in north-eastern France.

The village belongs to the Pays de Bitche and to the Northern Vosges Regional Nature Park. As of 2017, the village's population is 1,630. The inhabitants of the commune are known as Montbronnois or Montbronnoises.

Geography

Location 

Located east of the Moselle department, the commune is part of the Pays de Bitche; It borders the neighboring Bas-Rhin department, a territory also known as Alsace bossue.

Neighboring communes include Rahling to the west, Bining, Rohrbach-lès-Bitche and Enchenberg to the north, Saint-Louis-lès-Bitche and Meisenthal to the east, and Soucht to the south.

Neighbouring communes and villages

Communications

Road network
The town is crossed from west to east (Main Street) by the D83 which connects Kalhausen to Enchenberg. This road crosses both the D110F and the D36A in the village, linking it to respectively Rohrbach-lès-Bitche and Lemberg. Thoses roads are later extended by several county roads. The nearest entrance to the Autoroute de L'Est (A4 autoroute) is via the D83 through the Sarre-Union interchange at Thal-Drulingen.

Public transport
The Sarreguemines–Bitche railway line has passed through the neighboring commune of Enchenberg from 1869 to 2014. The railway line is now disused and has been replaced by a TER Grand Est bus line. Today, the nearest SNCF station is in Diemeringen, served by the Sarreguemines–Strasbourg railway line.

Administration

Canton and intercommunality
Montbronn is one of 46 communes in the canton of Bitche. Its general counsels since the French legislative election of 2012 are Anne Mazuy-Harter (DVD) and David Suck (UDI).

The town is part of the Pays de Bitche federation of municipalities which as of January 1, 2017 consists of the same 46 communes as the canton. This grouping is headed by Francis Vogt, municipal counsel of Bitche.

List of successive mayors

Population
In 2017 the commune had 1,630 inhabitants.

Local life

Language
The majority of the inhabitants can speak and/or understand German and also speak French. The local dialect is known as Lorraine Franconian.  Lorraine Franconian is a dialect of German that has been spoken and developed in the region for over a thousand years.

Education
Montbronn depends on the Academy of Nancy-Metz.

The village is provided with a preschool and a primary school.

To pursue their studies in high school, young Montbronnois mainly go to Bitche or Sarreguemines.

Health
Two general practitioners reside in Montbronn. Thus, both a medical home and a pharmacy are located in the village. As for hospitals, they are located in Bitche, Ingwiller, Sarreguemines, Saverne, Haguenau and Strasbourg.

See also

Bibliography

Related articles 
 Communes of the Moselle department
 Pays de Bitche

References

External links

 
 
 
 

Communes of Moselle (department)
Moselle communes articles needing translation from French Wikipedia